"Shanghaied", also known as "You Wish", is an episode of the American animated television series SpongeBob SquarePants. It is the first part of the 13th episode of the second season, and the first half of the 33rd episode overall. It was directed by Aaron Springer and written by Springer, C. H. Greenblatt, and Merriwether Williams, with the animation directed by Frank Weiss. Greenblatt also served as the storyboard artist.

The series follows the adventures and endeavours of the title character and his various friends in the underwater city of Bikini Bottom. In this episode, SpongeBob, Patrick, and Squidward encounter the Flying Dutchman, a ghostly pirate who seeks to acquire a new eternal crew to scare the residents of Bikini Bottom. As SpongeBob and Patrick do a poor job as his crew, the pirate considers devouring them instead, leading the two to try to figure out how to thwart his plan.

"Shanghaied" originally aired as a television special on Nickelodeon in the United States on March 9, 2001, and featured a poll where viewers can vote on the outcome of the episode; subsequent broadcasts have since shown a revised version which removed references to this voting feature. The episode received critical acclaim from online pop culture critics for its extensive and hilarious gags, and is generally ranked highly among their lists for the best SpongeBob SquarePants episodes. The original broadcast version was released on "The First 100 Episodes" DVD of the series in 2009 while the revised version was released on "The Complete Second Season" DVD set in 2004.

Plot
In Encino, California, SpongeBob SquarePants fan Patchy the Pirate presents his favorite episode "Shanghaied" to audiences.

SpongeBob is shocked to find that an anchor has suddenly dropped onto his house, and alerts his next door neighbor, Squidward. After his house is damaged by the anchor, Squidward begins climbing the anchor rope to see where it came from, with SpongeBob and Patrick joining him. The three come across a ghost ship, which they board. The Flying Dutchman appears, and explains that anyone who sets foot on his ship will be forced to serve as his "ghostly" crew for eternity. Due to Squidward's complaining, the pirate throws him into the "Fly of Despair", a void filled with horrific imagery, intimidating SpongeBob and Patrick into becoming part of the ship's crew.

The Flying Dutchman sends SpongeBob and Patrick on a Bikini Bottom haunting spree, but they fail to frighten citizens. Due to their poor performance, the Flying Dutchman decides that he will instead eat them. The two escape, and overhear the Flying Dutchman mentioning in his diary that he cannot eat without his "dining sock", which they steal. The Flying Dutchman proposes that if they give back the sock, he will give them three wishes. They accept, and Patrick wastes the first wish, while SpongeBob accidentally wishes for Squidward to join them, returning him to the ship.

SpongeBob, Patrick, and Squidward argue as to who should get the last wish. The Flying Dutchman intervenes, and decides to give the last wish to SpongeBob. SpongeBob wishes that the Flying Dutchman was a vegetarian, assuring that he will not eat them. The three are then seemingly transported back to SpongeBob's pineapple home, but quickly realize that they have been turned into fruits, and are now in the Flying Dutchman's blender. 

After the episode proper, Patchy tries to read fan mail, only to be blown up with his parrot Potty who lit a fuse on himself, not knowing it was no longer planned for the program.

Release
"Shanghaied" originally aired on Nickelodeon in the United States as a television special titled "You Wish" on March 9, 2001. In the special, viewers who tuned in could vote by telephone or online for who gets the wish at the end of the episode. After SpongeBob received the most votes, the original episode proper had SpongeBob get the wish, and Patchy then featured what would have happened if viewers voted for either Squidward or Patrick.

For every subsequent broadcast of the episode, SpongeBob is the official character selected to get the wish, while the segments featuring Patchy the Pirate are trimmed down to remove any reference to the original polling feature of the episode. The original broadcast version of the episode was released on the 14-disc DVD collection titled "The First 100 Episodes" on September 22, 2009, while the revised version was released on "SpongeBob SquarePants: The Complete Second Season" DVD collection on October 19, 2004; the latter release includes a commentary track for the episode from director Aaron Springer, animation director Frank Weiss, and writer C.H. Greenblatt. The revised version would also be featured in the UK edition of the "SpongeBob Squarepants: Ghoul Fools" DVD release on October 8, 2012, with dubbing in French, German, Italian, and Dutch.

A five-minute edit of the episode was released on YouTube by the official SpongeBob SquarePants YouTube account.

Critical reception
"Shanghaied" received critical acclaim from online pop culture critics. Lizzie Manno of Paste ranked "Shanghaied" at  3 in her top ten list of SpongeBob SquarePants episodes, commending the episode's abundance of jokes and stating that it "might be the most underrated episode of Spongebob due to its high laugh ratio." Jaclyn Kessel of Decider ranked "Shanghaied" at  1 in her "10 Essential 'SpongeBob Squarepants' Episodes" list, writing that "[t]he terrific writing, creativity, and absolute goofiness of 'Shanghaied' makes it the best episode ever." Jared Russo of the website Medium ranked the episode at  1 in his top 100 list, praising its clever dialogue and "hilarious" gags and expressing that it "perfectly encapsulates the humor that SpongeBob is known for.... I’ve been watching this episode for thirteen years now, and I still find it funny." Elijah Ackerman, who also writes for Medium, gave praise to the episode as well, describing its pace as "really really fast" and stating that "it gets better with every watch." Oliver Whitney of TV Guide ranked "Shanghaied" at  6 in his "100 Best SpongeBob SquarePants Episodes" list, while Aaron Kirby of WhatCulture ranked it at  10 in his top ten list.

References

External links

2001 American television episodes
American television specials
Fiction with alternate endings
Piracy in fiction
SpongeBob SquarePants episodes
Television episodes about ghosts
Television episodes with live action and animation
Film and television memes